Hlushko is a Ukrainian surname, that may refer to :

People
 Todd Hlushko (born 1970), a Canadian former professional ice hockey player
 Valentyn Hlushko (1908-1989), a Ukrainian Soviet engineer
 Yurii Hlushko-Mova (1882-1942), a Ukrainian public and political figure

See also
 Halushko (Ukrainian: Галушко)